Bakhtigareyevo (Bäxtegäräy) is a rural locality (a village) in Meryasovsky Selsoviet, Baymaksky District, Bashkortostan, Russia. The population was 84 as of 2010. There is 1 street.

Geography 
It is located 20 km from Baymak and 10 km from Meryasovo.

References 

Rural localities in Baymaksky District